China Mobile is the trade name of both China Mobile Limited and its ultimate controlling shareholder, China Mobile Communications Group Co., Ltd. (formerly known as China Mobile Communications Corporation, "CMCC"), a Chinese state-owned company. China Mobile Limited provides mobile voice and multimedia services through its nationwide mobile telecommunications network across mainland China and Hong Kong. China Mobile is the largest wireless carrier in China, with 945.50 million subscribers as of June 2021.

China Mobile Limited is listed on the Hong Kong Stock Exchange. It is the world's largest mobile network operator by total number of subscribers.

, China Mobile Limited's total market value stood at HK$965 billion, which is the largest red chip company.

History
Incorporated in 1997 as China Telecom (Hong Kong) Limited, China Mobile was born from the 1999 break-up of China Telecommunications Corporation. This company continues to provide mobile services, however.

In May 2008, the company took over China Tietong, a fixed-line telecom and the then third-largest broadband ISP in China adding Internet services to its core business of mobile services.

In October 2014, Nokia and China Mobile signed a $970 million framework deal for delivery between 2014 and 2015.

In December 2021, China Mobile announced that its international arm would cease operations in Canada due to national security concerns by the Canadian government.

U.S. sanctions 
In November 2020, President Donald Trump issued an executive order prohibiting any American company or individual from owning shares in companies that the United States Department of Defense has listed as having links to the People's Liberation Army, which included China Mobile. On 31 December 2020, the New York Stock Exchange announced that it would suspend trading in China Mobile, China Telecom, and China Unicom from 7 to 11 January 2021 and start the delisting process, causing stock values to drop. On 4 January the decision to delist was suddenly reversed; two days later, the NYSE said that the delistings would proceed. In the aftermath of the delisting, the company announced its decision to raise up to US$8.8 billion ahead of the Shanghai stock exchange listing, according to an official Weibo post by the company.

In March 2022, the Federal Communications Commission designated China Mobile's U.S. subsidiary, China Mobile International USA, a national security threat.

Ownership and control
A state-owned enterprise directly controlled by the government of the People's Republic of China and also a public company which is listed on the NYSE and the Hong Kong stock exchanges, China Mobile has dominated Chinese mobile services since its inception for civilian and military purposes. According to the United States Department of Defense, the company has links to the People's Liberation Army. , China Mobile controls the vast majority of its domestic mobile services market with a 70% market share. China Unicom and China Telecom have 20% and 10% shares, respectively.

The company likely enjoys substantial protectionist benefits from China's government but also experiences frequent government intervention in its business affairs. Government control is maintained through a presumably government-owned holding company, China Mobile Communications Group Co., Ltd. (formerly: China Mobile Communications Corporation; CMCC), that owns 100 percent ownership of China Mobile (HK) Group Limited, which in turn holds over seventy percent ownership of China Mobile–the remainder being controlled by public investors. Established in 2000, CMCC is China Mobile Ltd's current parent company .

Services

Rural subscriber base

China Mobile has historically held a greater share of the rural market than competitors. By 2006, its network had expanded to provide reception to 97% of the Chinese population, and the company has since seen a sustained stream of new, rural mobile customers.

It also offers services targeted at the rural market including an agricultural information service, which facilitates a variety of activities such as the sale and purchase of agricultural products, access to market prices for produce and crops, wire transfers, bank withdrawals, and payments, etc.

Overseas activities
The company branched out in 2007 with the purchase of Paktel in Pakistan launching the Zong brand there a year later.

In 2013, China Mobile eyed expansion into Myanmar expressing interest in bidding for one of two licences on offer in a partnership with Vodafone although this plan ultimately fell through.

Brands

Mainland China

Mobile services are available in Mainland China under several brands as of 2007. , the below brands are scheduled to be slowly phased out and replaced by an all-encompassing new brand name—And—whose logo combines an exclamation point, the Chinese character for "peace", as well as the English word "and".
 
Easyown

( Rough translation: "Travel across China" (lit. "travel the holy states")): a basic prepaid mobile phone service more heavily marketed in rural areas
GoTone
( Rough translation: "Global Connect"): subscription flagship brand
M-zone
( Rough translation: "Dynamic Area"): a premium prepaid service popular with youths
G3
A 3G service brand using TD-SCDMA (likely introduced post-2007)
and!和
A 4G/LTE service brand using TD-LTE

Hong Kong
CMHK is a wholly owned subsidiary of China Mobile. It offers GSM, GPRS, EDGE, HSPA+ (MVNO), FD-LTE and TD-LTE technologies to customers in this the Hong Kong Special Administrative Region.

Pakistan
Zong is China Mobile's brand in Pakistan and is operated by China Mobile Pakistan (CMPak), a subsidiary.

United Kingdom
In December 2017, China Mobile launched a MVNO service in the UK called CMLink. CMLink is aimed at the Chinese population living in the UK and Chinese visitors and students. Plans include free calls to China Mobile phones in China.

Singapore 
In June 2020, China Mobile launched a MVNO service called CMLink. It uses Singtel networks, which is one of Singapore's largest mobile network operator.

CMLink is aimed at the Chinese population living in the Singapore and Chinese visitors and students. Plans include free calls to China Mobile phones in China.

Network
China Mobile operates a GSM network, which encompasses all 31 provinces, autonomous regions, and directly administered municipalities in Mainland China and includes Hong Kong, too. GPRS is utilized for data transmission.

3G
Marketed as "G3", the company controls 70% of the Chinese mobile market but a far smaller percentage of the 3G market. , its nearly 60 million 3G subscribers account for roughly 9% of its total subscriber base, which is an increase from 3% in 2010.

Its 3G network, still under construction in 2010, utilizes the TD-SCDMA standard, which China Mobile helped develop. 3G service is available in all of the 4 direct-controlled municipalities and most of the 283 prefecture-level cities in China .

4G
Marketed as "and和", as of 2010, China Mobile has debuted small-scale 4G demonstration networks using a variant of 3GPP's Long Term Evolution, TD-LTE, and has plans for larger, citywide demonstration networks in the future. , such networks are in operation.

While prior iPhone models couldn't use the China Mobile network due to the chipset relying on WCDMA-based networks, talks to carry the then unreleased 4G iPhone (iPhone 5) began in mid-2012. The iPhone 5c and iPhone 5s were sold through China Mobile starting in January 2014.

Everest
In 2003 and again in 2007, China Mobile provided mobile services on Mount Everest.

Spratly Isles coverage
In May 2011, China Mobile announced its network now includes the controversial Spratly Islands.

See also 

 List of largest companies by revenue
 List of mobile network operators
 List of mobile network operators of the Americas
 List of mobile network operators of the Asia Pacific region
 List of mobile network operators of the Middle East and Africa

References

External links
 

 

 
1997 establishments in China
Chinese brands
Telecommunications companies established in 1997
Companies listed on the Hong Kong Stock Exchange
Companies formerly listed on the New York Stock Exchange
Government-owned companies of China
Internet service providers of China
Defence companies of the People's Republic of China
Government-owned telecommunications companies